The 304th Bombardment Group is an inactive United States Army Air Forces (AAF) unit.  Its last assignment was with the Army Air Forces Antisubmarine Command, based at Langley Field, Virginia.  It was inactivated on 30 December 1942

History
The group was activated in July 1942 but did not receive personnel until September 1942 when it began training on the west coast.  Its original assigned squadrons were the 361st, 362d, 363d, and 421st Bombardment Squadrons

In October 1942, the group moved to Langley Field and operated with AAF Antisubmarine Command, using such planes as B-17 Flying Fortress, B-18 Bolo, B-24 Liberator and A-20 Havoc to fly Anti-submarine warfare patrols along the east coast. The 304th also trained crews for antisubmarine patrol duty overseas.  In early November, the 361st squadron moved to St Eval, England and began antisubmarine operations for Eighth Air Force.  In late November, three of the group's squadrons were redesignated as Antisubmarine Squadrons.  In December the group was inactivated and its squadrons transferred to the 25th Antisubmarine Wing.

Lineage
 Constituted as 304th Bombardment Group (Heavy) on 28 January 1942
 Activated on 15 July 1942
 Inactivated on 30 December 1942

Assignments
 II Bomber Command, 28 January 1942
 Army Air Forces Antisubmarine Command, 29 October 1942 - 30 December 1942

Squadrons
 361st Bombardment Squadron (later 1st Antisubmarine Squadron): 15 July 1942 - 30 December 1942
 Air echelon attached to VIII Bomber Command, after c. 10 November 1942
 362d Bombardment Squadron (later 18th Antisubmarine Squadron): 15 July 1942 - 30 December 1942
 363d Bombardment Squadron (later 19th Antisubmarine Squadron): 15 July 1942 - 30 December 1942
 421st Bombardment Squadron: 15 July-6 November 1942

Stations
 Salt Lake City AAB, Utah, 15 July 1942
 Geiger Field, Washington, 15 September 1942
 Ephrata, Washington, 1 October 1942
 Langley Field, Virginia, 29 October-30 December 1942.

Notes and references

Military units and formations established in 1942
Bombardment groups of the United States Army Air Forces
Military units and formations in Washington (state)